Andualem Nigussie (is an Ethiopian footballer currently playing for Kenbata shinshico Kenema.

Andualem is offensive midfielder who currently plays as a striker; he is a regular member of the national team. He began his career at Muger Cement before joining Saint-George FC in 2022. He is currently playing for Kembata shinshicho kenema FC.

References
 

1985 births
Living people
Sportspeople from Oromia Region
Ethiopian footballers
Ethiopia international footballers
Association football midfielders